William Emerson may refer to:

Architects
 William Emerson (American architect) (1873–1957), first dean of the MIT School of Architecture
 William Emerson (British architect) (1843–1924)
 William Ralph Emerson (1833–1917), American Shingle-style architect

Others
 William Emerson (mathematician) (1701–1782), English mathematician
 William Emerson Sr. (died 1776), minister and grandfather of Ralph Waldo Emerson
 William Emerson (minister) (1769–1811), Unitarian minister, father of Ralph Waldo Emerson
 William Henry Emerson (1860–1924), American chemist
 William Emerson (footballer) (1891–1961), British footballer for Burnley and Glentoran
 William A. Emerson (1921–2017), senior vice president and national sales director of Merrill Lynch
 William Emerson (journalist) (1923–2009), American journalist
 William Keith Emerson (1925–2016), American malacologist
 Bill Emerson (1938–1996), American politician from Missouri
 Bill Emerson (musician) (born 1938), American country music performer
 Billy "The Kid" Emerson (born 1925), preacher and former R&B and rock and roll singer and songwriter

See also 
 Emerson (surname)
William Emmerson (1801–1868), English cricketer
Bill Emmerson (born 1945), American politician from California